Dead Coon Lake is a lake in Lincoln County, in the U.S. state of Minnesota.

Dead Coon Lake was named for the dead raccoon seen at this lake by early surveyors.

References

Lakes of Minnesota
Lakes of Lincoln County, Minnesota